Charles Joseph Riefenhauser (born January 30, 1990) is an American professional baseball pitcher. He played in Major League Baseball (MLB) for the Tampa Bay Rays. He is the head baseball coach at Yorktown High School, a position he has held since 2019.

Playing career

Amateur career
Riefenhauser was raised in Mahopac, New York, and he graduated from Mahopac High School. He then attended Chipola Junior College.

Tampa Bay Rays
Riefenhauser was drafted in the 20th round of the 2010 Major League Baseball draft. That year he played for the Princeton Rays and the Bowling Green Hot Rods, and recorded a combined ERA of 2.25 with only 28.0 IP. In the 2011 season he played for both the Hot Rods and the Charlotte Stone Crabs with an ERA of 2.80 and 138.1 IP.

Riefenhauser represented the Rays at the 2013 All-Star Futures Game. He was added to the Rays 40-man roster on November 20, 2013. He was called up on April 19, 2014 to make his MLB debut, and sent back down on April 21. He was recalled again on September 16, after the Durham Bulls' post-season ended.

In 2015, Riefenhauser made 17 appearances with the Rays, earning his first major league win on June 14 against the Chicago White Sox.

Chicago Cubs
On November 5, 2015, the Rays traded Riefenhauser, Nate Karns, and Boog Powell to the Seattle Mariners for Brad Miller, Danny Farquhar, and Logan Morrison.

On December 2, before ever suiting up for the Mariners, Riefenhauser was the player to be named later traded along with Mark Trumbo to the Baltimore Orioles for Steve Clevenger. He was designated for assignment by the Orioles on February 4, 2016, and claimed by the Chicago Cubs on February 12. He was released on August 20, 2016.

Houston Astros
On December 6, 2016, Riefenhauser signed a minor league contract with the Houston Astros. He was released on March 27, 2017.

Rockland Boulders
On May 20, 2017, Riefenhauser signed with the Rockland Boulders of the Can-Am League. He was released on April 13, 2018.

Coaching career
In September 2019, Riefenhauser was hired as the coach for the baseball team at Yorktown High School in Yorktown Heights, New York.

References

External links

1990 births
Living people
Arizona League Cubs players
Baseball players from New York (state)
Bowling Green Hot Rods players
Bravos de Margarita players
American expatriate baseball players in Venezuela
Charlotte Stone Crabs players
Chipola Indians baseball players
Durham Bulls players
Iowa Cubs players
Major League Baseball pitchers
Montgomery Biscuits players
Phoenix Desert Dogs players
Princeton Rays players
Rockland Boulders players
Sportspeople from Yonkers, New York
Tampa Bay Rays players